Salem Creek is a stream in the municipal township of Cramahe, Northhumberland County in Central Ontario, Canada. It is a tributary of Lake Ontario. The creek takes its name from the community of Salem which it flows past.

References

Rivers of Northumberland County, Ontario
Tributaries of Lake Ontario